The Apodaca–Canning treaty (formally the Treaty of Peace, Friendship, and Alliance, between his Britannic majesty and his Catholic majesty, Ferdinand the 7th) was a treaty between the United Kingdom and Spain signed by Juan Ruiz de Apodaca and George Canning on 14 January 1809.

The popular uprising of 2 May led the Junta of Seville to seek help from Britain in their resistance to France. In this treaty, Britain was given trade facilitation in the Spanish domains, in exchange for military supplies to support the armies and guerrilla troops of Spain.

Notes

External links
 Your Democracy - Treaty With Spain

1809 treaties
Napoleonic Wars treaties
Treaties of the Spanish Empire
Peace treaties of Spain
Peace treaties of the United Kingdom
Treaties of the United Kingdom (1801–1922)
Spain–United Kingdom relations
Bilateral treaties of the United Kingdom